This is a list of electoral divisions and wards in the ceremonial county of South Yorkshire in Yorkshire and the Humber. All changes since the re-organisation of local government following the passing of the Local Government Act 1972 are shown. The number of councillors elected for each electoral division or ward is shown in brackets.

District councils

Barnsley
Wards from 1 April 1974 (first election 10 May 1973) to 3 May 1979:

Wards from 3 May 1979 to 10 June 2004:

Wards from 10 June 2004 to present:

Doncaster
Wards from 1 April 1974 (first election 10 May 1973) to 1 May 1980:

Wards from 1 May 1980 to 10 June 2004:

Wards from 10 June 2004 to 7 May 2015:

Wards from 7 May 2015 to present:

Rotherham
Wards from 1 April 1974 (first election 10 May 1973) to 1 May 1980:

Wards from 1 May 1980 to 10 June 2004:

Wards from 10 June 2004 to 6 May 2021:

† minor boundary changes in 2011

Wards from 6 May 2021 to present:

Sheffield
Wards from 1 April 1974 (first election 10 May 1973) to 1 May 1980:

Wards from 1 May 1980 to 10 June 2004:

Wards from 10 June 2004 to 5 May 2016:

Wards from 5 May 2016 to present:

Former county council

South Yorkshire
Electoral Divisions from 1 April 1974 (first election 12 April 1973) to 1 April 1986 (county abolished):

Electoral wards by constituency

Barnsley Central
Central, Darton East, Darton West, Kingstone, Monk Bretton, Old Town, Royston, St Helens.

Barnsley East
Cudworth, Darfield, Hoyland Milton, North East, Rockingham, Stairfoot, Wombwell, Worsbrough.

Don Valley
Conisbrough and Denaby, Edlington and Warmsworth, Finningley, Hatfield, Rossington, Thorne, Torne Valley.

Doncaster Central
Armthorpe, Balby, Bessacarr and Cantley, Central, Edenthorpe, Hexthorpe & Balby North, Kirk Sandall and Barnby Dun, Town Moor, Wheatley.

Doncaster North
Adwick, Askern, Bentley, Great North Road, Mexborough, Sprotbrough, Stainforth and Moorends.

Penistone and Stocksbridge
East Ecclesfield, Dodworth, Penistone East, Penistone West, Stocksbridge and Upper Don, West Ecclesfield.

Rother Valley
Anston and Woodsetts, Dinnington, Hellaby, Holderness, Maltby, Rother Vale, Sitwell, Wales.

Rotherham
Boston Castle, Brinsworth and Catcliffe, Keppel, Rotherham East, Rotherham West, Valley, Wingfield.

Sheffield, Brightside and Hillsborough
Burngreave, Firth Park, Hillsborough, Shiregreen and Brightside, Southey.

Sheffield Central
Broomhill, Central, Manor Castle, Nether Edge, Walkley.

Sheffield, Hallam
Crookes, Dore and Totley, Ecclesall, Fulwood, Stannington.

Sheffield, Heeley
Arbourthorne, Beauchief and Greenhill, Gleadless Valley, Graves Park, Richmond.

Sheffield South East
Beighton, Birley, Darnall, Mosborough, Woodhouse.

Wentworth and Dearne
Dearne North, Dearne South, Hoober, Rawmarsh, Silverwood, Swinton, Wath, Wickersley.

See also
List of parliamentary constituencies in South Yorkshire

References
http://www.opsi.gov.uk/si/si2007/uksi_20071681_en_1

South Yorkshire
 
Wards